This is a list of universities and research institutes in the Australian city of Melbourne.

Research institutes 
AgriBio
Australian Regenerative Medicine Institute
Australian Stem Cell Centre
Australian Synchrotron
Baker Heart and Diabetes Institute
Bio21 Institute
Brain Research Institute
Burnet Institute
Howard Florey Institute
La Trobe Institute for Molecular Science
Melbourne Neuropsychiatry Centre
Murdoch Childrens Research Institute
National Ageing Research Institute
Peter MacCallum Cancer Centre
St. Vincent's Institute of Medical Research
The Walter and Eliza Hall Institute of Medical Research
Victorian Institute of Chemical Sciences

Universities 
Australian Institute of Music
Australian Catholic University
Deakin University
La Trobe University
Monash University
Royal Melbourne Institute of Technology
Swinburne University of Technology
University of Melbourne
University of Divinity
Victoria University
Royal Gurkhas Institute of Technology

See also
 Education in Melbourne
 List of high schools in Melbourne

Universities in Melbourne
Universities
Universities
Melbourne
Melbourne
Melbourne
Science and technology in Melbourne